The 2006 Walsall Metropolitan Borough Council election took place on 4 May 2006 to elect members of Walsall Metropolitan Borough Council in the West Midlands, England. One third of the council was up for election and the Conservative Party stayed in overall control of the council.

After the election, the composition of the council was:
Conservative 34
Labour 19
Liberal Democrat 6
Independent 1

Election result
The results saw the Conservatives retain control of the council with 34 councillors, but they lost 2 seats to Labour who moved to 19 seats. The Liberal Democrats remained on 6 seats and there remained one independent councillor.

Ward results

References

2006 English local elections
2006
2000s in the West Midlands (county)